Pendidikan Stadium is a multi-use stadium in Wamena, Indonesia.  It is currently used mostly for football matches and is used as the home stadium for Persiwa Wamena. The stadium has a capacity of 15,000 people.

Tournament

References

Sports venues in Indonesia
Football venues in Indonesia
Buildings and structures in Highland Papua